Al Ekhbariya is an Arabic news and current affairs satellite TV channel based in Riyadh, Saudi Arabia.

History
Launched on 11 January 2004, its aim according to its director was to present "a new image of the Gulf Arab state" to the wider region and the world. After the hiring of several Saudi women, its first bulletin was read by the kingdom's first female news presenter Buthaina Al-Nassr. Correspondents are based across the Middle East, Europe and America to provide coverage of news stories from around the world.

The channel, like its main competitor Al Jazeera, is owned by its government and run by the Ministry of Media, along with other channels that are part of the Saudi Television network. The station is transmitted to the Middle East and the Arabic speaking world from the Badr 4 satellite at an orbital position of 26.0° East.

References

External links

 Al Ekhbariya website
 LyngSat Address information
 Sat Updates

24-hour television news channels
Television channels and stations established in 2004
Television stations in Saudi Arabia
Arabic-language television stations
Mass media in Riyadh